Porter Flats Apartments is a historic residential building in Helena, Montana. It was designed in the Italianate style, and built in 1884 by James Porter, a farmer, schoolteacher and real estate developer. It is "purported to be the first apartment building constructed in Helena." It was listed on the National Register of Historic Places in 1993.

References

National Register of Historic Places in Helena, Montana
Residential buildings completed in 1884
1884 establishments in Montana Territory
Residential buildings on the National Register of Historic Places in Montana
Italianate architecture in Montana